Deep Bay may refer to:

 Deep Bay, British Columbia, Canada
 Deep Bay, China
 Deep Bay, Newfoundland and Labrador, Canada

See also

 Deep Bay crater
 Deep Bay Water Aerodrome
 Deep Water Bay, a bay and residential area on the southern shore of Hong Kong Island